In the 2008–09 season, Partizan Belgrade will compete in the Basketball League of Serbia, Radivoj Korać Cup, Adriatic League and Euroleague.

Players

Roster

Current depth chart

Preseason and friendlies

Competitions

Basketball League of Serbia

Group A 

P=Matches played, W=Matches won, L=Matches lost, F=Points for, A=Points against, D=Points difference, Pts=Points

Semifinals

Final

Adriatic League

Standings

Regular season

Final four

Semifinals

Final

Kup Radivoja Koraća

Quarterfinals

Semifinals

Final

Euroleague

Regular season

Group D

Top 16

Group G

Quarterfinals

Individual awards
Euroleague

EuroLeague Rising Star
 Novica Veličković

Coach of the Year (Alexander Gomelsky Award)
  Duško Vujošević

Euroleague MVP of the Month
 Novica Veličković, February

Euroleague Weekly MVPs
 Novica Veličković – TOP 16, Week 2

Adriatic League

MVP of the Round
 Novica Veličković – Round 14
 Novica Veličković – Final

Radivoj Korać Cup

Finals MVP
 Novica Veličković

Basketball League of Serbia

Finals MVP
 Novica Veličković

External links
 Official website

KK Partizan seasons
Partizan
Partizan